The 1971 National 500 was a NASCAR Winston Cup Series racing event that took place on October 10, 1971, at Charlotte Motor Speedway in Concord, North Carolina.  Most of the vehicles used in the race had a rating of 427 cubic inches.

The race car drivers still had to commute to the races using the same stock cars that competed in a typical weekend's race through a policy of homologation (and under their own power). This policy was in effect until roughly 1975. By 1980, NASCAR had completely stopped tracking the year model of all the vehicles and most teams did not take stock cars to the track under their own power anymore.

Race report
There were 42 American-born drivers on this 238-lap race. It was supposed to last for 334 laps but the race had to end due to rain and darkness. On the day of the race, 0.22 inches of precipitation were recorded around the speedway.

Bobby Allison managed to defeat Bobby Isaac by five seconds in front of 52000 people. The race lasted more than two and a half hours with six caution periods lasting for 37 laps.

Jim Vandiver would end up getting the last-place finish on lap 10 due to a single-car collision into the wall. Wendell Scott had to leave the race because his vehicle developed faulty wheel bearings on lap 63 while Dick Brooks' vehicle broke down early and finished poorly on lap 73. A faulty lug bolt took Neil Castles of the race on lap 114 while an engine problem took Maynard Troyer out of the race on lap 115. A couple of crashes on lap 120 took LeeRoy Yarbrough and Earle Canavan out of the race while steering problems took Dave Marcis out of the race on lap 152. Stick Elliot's vehicle developed a faulty driveshaft on lap 163 while lap 184 would see A.J. Foyt retiring from the race due to steering problems. Cale Yarborough would overheat his car on lap 209, ending his hopes of acquiring a top-ten finish.

Tiny Lund also had a Pepsi car in this one but dropped out early on.

Country music singing sensation and part-time NASCAR driver Marty Robbins would finish in 37th place in his 1969 Dodge Charger machine after starting in 15th. LeeRoy Yarbrough ran a limited schedule during the 1971 season as Ford's factories were pulling out of NASCAR production at that time. This would force NASCAR teams using the Ford manufacturer to create vehicles by themselves with their in-house staff. Injuries sustained while practicing for that year's Indianapolis 500 contributed to the limited NASCAR schedule. He managed to shake off those injuries long enough to qualify in seventh place and finish in a lowly 34th place.

The total purse of the race was $83,259 ($ when adjusted for inflation); Allison would earn $18,450 of the total prize winnings that were offered in the race ($ when adjusted for inflation).

Qualifying

Finishing order

 Bobby Allison
 Bobby Isaac
 Donnie Allison
 Richard Petty
 Charlie Glotzbach
 Buddy Baker
 Pete Hamilton
 Friday Hassler
 James Hylton
 Benny Parsons
 Joe Frasson
 Jabe Thomas
 Frank Warren
 Elmo Langley
 Cecil Gordon
 Bill Champion
 Bill Seifert
 David Ray Boggs
 Ed Negre
 Walter Ballard
 Earl Brooks
 J.D. McDuffie
 Ben Arnold
 Bobby Brack
 Larry Smith
 Johnny Halford
 Henley Gray
 Cale Yarborough
 John Sears
 A. J. Foyt
 Stick Elliott
 Dave Marcis
 Earle Canavan
 LeeRoy Yarbrough
 Maynard Troyner
 Neil Castles
 Marty Robbins
 Tiny Lund
 Dick Brooks
 Bill Dennis
 Wendell Scott
 Jim Vandiver

References

National 500
National 500
National 500
NASCAR races at Charlotte Motor Speedway